Hermopolis also known as Hermopolis Mikra and Hermopolis Parva was an ancient city of Egypt. It was located on an island near the city Butosos now Buto (Strabo xvii. p. 802).

See also
 List of ancient Egyptian towns and cities

References

Cities in ancient Egypt
Former populated places in Egypt